The Six Days of Madrid is a former six-day cycling event, held in Madrid, Spain. Fourteen editions of the event were held between 1960 and 1986.

Winners

References

Sports competitions in Madrid
Cycle races in Spain
Six-day races
Defunct cycling races in Spain
Recurring sporting events established in 1960
1960 establishments in Spain
Recurring sporting events disestablished in 1986
1986 disestablishments in Spain